Ulster Queen or the queen of Ulster, may refer to:

People
 Queen of Ulster, the consort to the King of Ulster
 Queen of the United Kingdom, in modern times, whom is thusly the Queen of Northern Ireland or Ulster
 Queen of Ireland, historically, when the high kingdom ruled Ulster

Ships
 , a pre-WWII passenger ferry running between Belfast and Liverpool
 , a mid-20th-century car-and-passenger ferry running the Irish Sea route
 , a WWII British Royal Navy anti-aircraft ship

Other uses
 Ulster Queen (horse), grandmother to St Louis (horse) and Louvois (horse)

See also

 Earl of Ulster and Countess of Ulster
 
 Ulster (disambiguation)
 Queen (disambiguation)

Disambiguation pages